Zephyranthes atamasca, commonly known as the atamasco-lily or more generally a rain-lily, is native to the southeastern United States. It grows in swampy forests and coastal prairies, preferring acid boggy soils rich with leaf mold. Following the appearance of broad, grassy leaves in early winter, it blooms in March or April.
Its native range extends from Florida north to Maryland and west to Mississippi. The species is also naturalized in Bermuda and in the Mariana Islands. Both its leaves and bulbs are poisonous.

Taxonomy
The scientific name of this species has a somewhat complex history. In 1753, in the first edition of Species Plantarum, Carl Linnaeus placed it in the genus Amaryllis  using the epithet "Atamasca" (the capital "A" showing that this was intended as a noun, not an adjective). However, in the second edition of Species Plantarum, he changed the spelling to "Atamasco" (again with a capital "A"). "Atamasco" is the Native American name. When in 1821, William Herbert transferred the species to his genus Zephyranthes he used Linnaeus's later spelling for the epithet, i.e. Zephyranthes atamasco, this being the type species of the genus. Many sources have used this spelling subsequently. However, the International Code of Nomenclature for algae, fungi, and plants conserves the type of Zephyranthes using the spelling atamasca.

Synonyms
Synonyms include the following:
 Amaryllis atamasco L., orth. var.
Note: Amaryllis atamasco  Blanco = Hippeastrum miniatum
 Amaryllis aramasco L., orth. var.
 Amaryllis atanasia Crantz
 Amaryllis pulchella Salisb.
 Amaryllis verecunda Salisb.
 Amaryllis virginiensis Oken
 Atamasco atamasco (L.) Greene, nom. inval.
 Zephyranthes atamasco var. minor Herb.

References

 Garden Bulbs for the South (1994)

External links
 
 

atamasca
Flora of the Southeastern United States
Garden plants of North America
Plants described in 1753
Taxa named by Carl Linnaeus
Flora without expected TNC conservation status